In Russia, internet censorship is enforced on the basis of several laws and through several mechanisms. Since 2012, Russia maintains a centralized internet blacklist (known as the "single register") maintained by the Federal Service for Supervision of Communications, Information Technology and Mass Media (Roskomnadzor).

The list is used for the censorship of individual URLs, domain names, and IP addresses. It was originally introduced to block sites that contain materials advocating drug abuse and drug production, descriptions of suicide methods, and containing child pornography. It was subsequently amended to allow the blocking of materials that are classified as extremist by including them to the Federal List of Extremist Materials. According to Freedom House, these regulations have been frequently abused to block criticism of the federal government or local administrations.

A law prohibiting "abuse of mass media freedom" implements a process for the shutting down of online media outlets. In March 2019 the bill which introduced fines for those who are deemed (by the government) to be spreading "fake news" and show "blatant disrespect" toward the state authorities was signed into law.

In June 2020, the European Court of Human Rights ruled against Russia in a case involving the blocking of websites critical of the government (including that of Garry Kasparov), as the plaintiffs' freedom of speech had been violated.

Status 

Russia was rated "partly free" in Freedom on the Net by Freedom House in 2009 (score 49), 2011 (score 52), 2012 (score 52), 2013 (score 54), and 2014 (score 60) and as "not free" in 2015 (score 62), 2016 (score 65), 2017 (score 66), and 2018 (score 67) where scores range from 0 (most free) to 100 (least free).

Russia was on Reporters Without Borders list of countries under surveillance from 2010 to 2013 and was moved to the Internet Enemies list in 2014.

Russia was found to engage in selective Internet filtering in the political and social areas and evidence of filtering was found in the conflict/security and Internet tools areas by the OpenNet Initiative in December 2010.

Since at least 2015, Russia has been collaborating with Chinese Great Firewall security officials in implementing its data retention and filtering infrastructure.

In September 2019, Roskomnadzor began installing equipment to isolate Russia, including mobile phones, from the rest of the Internet in the event the government directs such action, as required by a law taking effect in November 2019. The government's justification was to counteract potential cyber attacks from the United States, but some worried it might create an online "iron curtain".

As of late February 2022, two of the world's leading social media platforms Facebook and Twitter have been restricted in Russia by Roskomnadzor as a wartime measure amid the invasion of Ukraine. Internet rights monitor NetBlocks reported that Twitter and Facebook platforms were restricted, or throttled, across multiple providers on 26 February and 27 February respectively, with the bans becoming near-total by 4 March.

Agencies 
Media in the Russian Federation, including the internet, is regulated by Roskomnadzor (Federal Service for Supervision in the Sphere of Telecom, Information Technologies and Mass Communications), a branch of the Ministry of Telecom and Mass Communications.

Roskomnadzor, along with several other agencies such as the Federal Drug Control Service, the Federal Consumer Protection Service, and the office of the Prosecutor General, can block certain classes of content without a court order: Calls for unsanctioned public actions, content deemed extremist, materials that violate copyright, information about juvenile victims of crime, child abuse imagery, information encouraging the use of drugs, and descriptions of suicide. Other content can be blocked with a court order.

Internet service providers (ISPs) are held legally responsible for any illegal content that is accessible to their users (intermediary liability).

History

Internet in 2004–2012 
In 2004 only a minority of Russians (8% of the population) had Internet access. In May 2008, some 32.7 million users in Russia had access to the Internet (almost 30% of the population). In 2012, 75.9 million Russians (53% of the population) had access. In December 2015, most of the country, 92.8 million Russians (70% of the population) had Internet access.

Following his visit to Russia in 2004, Álvaro Gil-Robles, then Commissioner for Human Rights of Council of Europe, noted the high quality of news and reaction speed of Russia's Internet media. Virtually all the main newspapers were available online, some even opting for Web as a sole information outlet. Russia's press agencies (including the most important Ria-Novosti and Itar-Tass) were also well represented in the Web.

In April 2008 Agence France-Presse noted that, "The Internet is the freest area of the media in Russia, where almost all television and many newspapers are under formal or unofficial government control".

As reported by Kirill Pankratov in April 2009 in The Moscow Times:
Even discounting the chaotic nature of the web, there is plenty of Russian-language material on political and social issues that is well-written and represents a wide range of views. This does not mean, though, that most Russians are well-informed of the important political and social issues of today. But this is largely a matter of personal choice, not government restrictions. If somebody is too lazy to make just a few clicks to read and become aware of various issues and points of view, maybe he deserves to be fed bland, one-sided government propaganda.

In a November 2009 address to the Federal Assembly, then President of Russia Dmitry Medvedev acknowledged that Russia was ranked only as the world's 63rd country based on estimates of the level of communications infrastructure development. He stressed the necessity to provide broadband Internet access to the whole Russian territory in five years, and to manage the transition to digital TV, as well as the 4G of cellular wireless standards.

In 2010 OpenNet Initiative noted, that while "the absence of overt state-mandated Internet filtering in Russia has led some observers to conclude that the Russian Internet represents an open and uncontested space", the government had a consistent, strategic approach to taking control over the information in electronic media. 2007 cyberattacks on Estonia and cyberattacks during the Russo-Georgian War (2008) may have been "an indication of the government’s active interest in mobilizing and shaping activities in Russian cyberspace".

Developments since 2012

Establishment and expansion of the blacklist 
First countrywide judicial censorship measures were taken by the government in the wake of the 2011–13 Russian protests. This included the Internet blacklist law, implemented in November 2012. The criteria for inclusion in the blacklist initially included child pornography, advocating suicide and illegal drugs. In 2013, the blacklist law was amended with content "suspected in extremism", "calling for illegal meetings", "inciting hatred" and "violating the established order".

The law allowed for flexible interpretation and inclusion of a wide array of content which was frequently abused by the law enforcement and administration for blanket blocking of publications criticizing state policy or describing daily problems of life in Russia.

Popular opposition websites encouraging protests against the court rulings in Bolotnaya Square case were for example blocked for "calling for illegal action"; Dumb Ways to Die, a public transport safety video, was blocked as "suicide propaganda"; websites discussing federalization of Siberia—as "attack on the foundations of the constitution"; an article on a gay activist being fired from job as well as LGBT support communities—as "propaganda of non-traditional sex relations"; publishing Pussy Riot logo—as "insult of the feelings of believers"; criticism of overspending of local governor—"insult of the authorities"; publishing a poem in support of Ukraine—"inciting hatred" etc. A separate class of materials blocked due to "extremism" are several religious publications, mostly Muslim and Jehovah's Witnesses. Bans can be challenged in courts, and in some cases these appeals are successful.

Proposals for further controls 
In 2015, Russia's Security Council proposed a number of further Internet controls to prevent hostile "influence on the population of the country, especially young people, intended to weaken cultural and spiritual values". Prevention of this "influence" also includes active countermeasures such as actions targeted at the population and young people of the states attempting to weaken Russia's cultural values. Another initiative proposes giving Roskomnadzor right to block any domain within the .ru TLD without a court order.

In February 2016, the business daily Vedomosti reported on a draft law by the Ministry of Telecom and Mass Communications titled "On an Autonomous Internet System". The bill calls for placing the domains .ru and .рф under government control and would make installation of the Russian state surveillance system SORM mandatory.

Ban on VPN and anonymizer providers 
A ban on all software and websites related to circumventing internet filtering in Russia, including VPN software, anonymizers, and instructions on how to circumvent government website blocking, was passed in 2017.

Increase in Internet censorship 
According to data published by the Russian Society for Internet Users founded by members of the Presidential Council for Human Rights, instances of censorship increased by a factor of 1.5 from 2013 to 2014. The incidents documented include not only instances of Internet blocking but also the use of force to shut down Internet users, such as beatings of bloggers or police raids.

Human rights NGO Agora reported that instances of Internet censorship increased ninefold from 2014 to 2015, rising from 1,019 to 9,022.

In April 2018, a Moscow court ordered the ban and blockage of the messaging app Telegram under anti-terrorism laws, for refusing to cooperate with the FSB and provide access to encrypted communications. Sales of virtual private network services increased significantly in the wake of the ban.

The FSB has also started lobbying against any "external" satellite Internet access initiatives, including proposals to introduce stricter controls against satellite Internet receivers, as well as opposition against Roskosmos taking orders to bring OneWeb satellites to space.

In December 2018, Google was fined 500,000 rubles for not removing blacklisted sites from its search results.

In March 2019, legislation was passed to ban the publication of "unreliable socially significant information", and materials that show "clear disrespect" for the Russian Federation or "bodies exercising state power". Russian media freedom watchdog Roskomsvoboda reported that a number of people were charged with administrative fines for simply sharing a video about insufficient school places in Krasnodar Krai on their Facebook pages, because the video was authored by "Open Russia", who is considered an "undesirable organization" by Russian authorities. The watchdog also noted an increasing trend of law enforcement using article 20.33 of the administrative violations code ("undesirable organizations"), which seems to be gradually replacing article 282 of the criminal code ("extremism") as the primary censorship instrument.

Deep packet inspection 
In April 2021 Roskomnadzor started enforcing throttling of Twitter traffic in Russia. The throttling was implemented with detection of domains t.co, twimg.com, and twitter.com wrapped in wildcards. Target website domains are being detected mostly in Server Name Indication part of TLS handshake. The latter resulted in throttling of all domains that contained "t.co" substring, including microsoft.com etc. (An example of the Scunthorpe problem) TLS extensions that would prevent censorship using SNI, such as Encrypted SNI, were already blocked in 2020.

In July 2021 GlobalCheck project, which monitors the actual scale and efficiency of the censorship, for the first time noticed widespread use of deep packet inspection (DPI) across large mobile providers which resulted in domains related to political activist Alexei Navalny being efficiently blocked across around 50% of Russian networks. The DPI solution, called TSPU (Russian: ТСПУ, технические средства противодействия угрозам, English: technical measures for threat protection), has been introduced in 2019 legislation that also proposed isolation of Russian segment of the Internet. The change, passed under the rationale of protecting Russian network from external attacks, has been described by activists as actually introduced with intention of strengthening the content censorship that has proven ineffective in many cases in the past.

The introduction of TSPU devices was associated by a number of problems experienced by players of World of Warships and other games, that was described as a side effect of the devices blocking a broad range of UDP ports.

Registration of instant messenger users 
In 2021 a new regulation was passed that requires all operators of instant messaging services in Russia to establish identity of users creating accounts in these services by means of verification of their mobile number. SIM card registration using passport is mandatory since 2010's. Using a public Wi-Fi also requires registration using mobile number.

Blocking Tor 
In November 2021 users in Russia started reporting issues with accessing Tor, while Roskomnadzor published an announcement on introduction of centralized blocking of "means of circumvention" of censorship.

In December 2021, the Washington Post together with dissident authors Andrei Soldatov and Irina Borogan, accused the US-based companies Keysight Technologies and Supermicro, and Sino-American Lenovo of supplying 60 servers and several Internet traffic analysis solutions to the Moscow control center for Internet censorship in Russia.

Monitoring

SORM system 

Russia's System of Operational-Investigatory Measures (SORM) requires telecommunications operators to install hardware provided by the Federal Security Service (FSB). It allows the agency to unilaterally monitor users' communications metadata and content, including phone calls, email traffic and web browsing activity. Metadata can be obtained without a warrant. In 2014, the system was expanded to include social media platforms, and the Ministry of Communications ordered companies to install new equipment with Deep Packet Inspection (DPI) capability.

Data sovereignty 

The "Bloggers law" (passed July 2014) is an amendment to existing anti-terrorism legislation which includes data localization and data retention provisions. Among other changes, it requires all web services to store the user data of Russian citizens on servers within the country. Sites which did not comply with this requirement by September 2016 may be added to the internet blacklist. Since August 2014, the law requires operators of free Wi-Fi hotspots (e.g. in restaurants, libraries, cafes etc.) to collect personal details of all users, identify them using passports, and store the data.

The "Yarovaya law" (passed July 2016) is a package of several legislative amendments which include extensions to data retention. Among other changes, it requires telecom operators to store recordings of phone conversations, text messages and users' internet traffic for up to 6 months, as well as metadata for up to 3 years. This data as well as "all other information necessary" is available to authorities on request and without a court order.

As of January 2018, companies registered in Russia as "organizers of information dissemination", such as online messaging applications, will not be permitted to allow unidentified users.

Mass media 

The federal telecommunications regulator Roskomnadzor can issue warnings to the editorial board of mass media and websites registered as mass media concerning "abuse of mass media freedom." According to the "Law on Mass Media", such abuse can include "extremist" content, information on recreational drug use, the propagation of cruelty and violence, as well as obscene language.

If a media outlet receives two warnings within a year, Roskomnadzor can request a court order shutting down the media outlet entirely.

Internet blacklist

Legislation 
In July 2012, Russia's State Duma passed a law requiring the establishment of an Internet blacklist. The law took effect on 1 November 2012.  The blacklist Is administered by the Federal Service for Supervision of Communications, Information Technology and Mass Media (Roskomnadzor) and the Federal Drug Control Service of Russia.

At the time of introduction the list was described as a means for the protection of children from harmful content; particularly content which glorifies drug usage, advocates suicide or describes suicide methods, or contains child pornography. In 2013 legislative amendments allowed the blocking of content "suspected in extremism", "calling for illegal meetings", "inciting hatred" and any other actions "violating the established order". This content can be blocked without a court order by the office of the Prosecutor General.

In July 2017, Vladimir Putin signed a bill, which took effect 1 November 2017, which bans all software and websites related to circumventing internet filtering in Russia, including anonymizers and Virtual private network (VPN) services which do not implement the blacklist, and instructional material on how to do so.

A number of individual instances of censorship were taken by Russian citizens to the European Court of Human Rights (Vladimir Kharitonov v.  Russia, OOO Flavus and Others v. Russia, Engels v. Russia) and in 2020 ruled that actions of Russian law enforcement in these cases was in clear violation of articles 10 and 13 of the European Convention on Human Rights.

Implementation 
The implementation of the blacklist is outlined in a government decree issued in October 2012.

Roskomnadzor offers a website where users can check to see whether a given URL or IP address is in the blacklist, and can also report websites which contain prohibited materials to the authorities. After a submission is verified, Roskomnadzor will inform the website's owner and hosting provider. If the material is not removed within three days, the website will be added to the blacklist, and all Russian ISPs must block it. The full content of the blacklist initially was not available to the general public, although soon after it was implemented, a leaked list of blacklisted websites was published by a LiveJournal user on 12 November 2012.

The searchable blacklist interface was made available as a full list by activists. As of July 2017 it includes over 70,000 entries.

Reaction 

Reporters Without Borders criticized the procedure by which entries are added to the blacklist as "extremely opaque", and viewed it as part of an attack on the freedom of information in Russia. In 2012, when the banned content only included child pornography, drugs and suicide, the human rights activists have expressed fear that the blacklist may be used to censor democracy-oriented websites (which indeed happened the next year). And a Lenta.ru editorial noted that the criteria for prohibited content are so broad that even the website of the ruling United Russia party could in theory be blacklisted. However, the idea was at that time generally supported by the Russian public: in a September 2012 Levada Center survey, 63% of respondents had expressed support for "Internet censorship", though any kind of censorship is banned under the Constitution of Russia.

The Electronic Frontier Foundation has criticized the blacklist, stating: "EFF is profoundly opposed to government censorship of the Internet, which violates its citizens right to freedom of expression... We are especially concerned about the censorship of independent news and opposing political views, which are essential to a thriving civil society. Russians who wish to circumvent government censorship can continue to read these websites via the Tor Browser."

Instances of censorship 

A number of websites maintain lists of websites currently blocked in Russia, based on different sources of information.

George Soros blocked

President Vladimir Putin signed the law in late 2013 about procedure for the Prosecutor General of Russia and Prosecutor General's Office to decide which websites may be blocked arbitrarily. Then the Russian Government passed the law about undesirable organizations in 2015, after which all suspected 'undesirable organizations' websites could also be arbitrarily blocked by the Prosecutor General's Office. After that, the 'undesirable' websites of philanthropist George Soros and a number of other were blocked in Russia.

The German Marshall Fund

The Russian government announced that the website of a US-based think tank, The German Marshall Fund, was to be blocked on March 11, 2018,  without any explanation. In total, 22 undesirable organizations were blocked between 2015 and 2020, including Open Russia, the National Endowment for Democracy, the Open Society Foundations, the U.S. Russia Foundation for Economic Advancement and the Rule of Law, Germany's European Platform for Democratic Elections, Lithuania's International Elections Study Center, Atlantic Council and the like.

Smart Voting 
In September 2021, ahead of the State Duma elections, several actions were taken to suppress Alexei Navalny's Smart Voting website and mobile app, which promoted opposition candidates in the election. 

A trademark on "Smart Voting" was secured by an agricultural company, Woolintertrade, which successfully received an injunction against Google and Yandex requiring them to censor queries for the string.

Roskomnadzor intensified use of TSPUs in what was interpreted as an attempt to suppress use of the website, including attempts to throttle IP addresses associated with Google services such as Google App Engine, and added Smart Voting's URLs to its blacklist as "extremist" materials, as they were classified as a continuation of the operations of the "extremist" Anti-Corruption Foundation. The targeting of Google Public DNS led to severe connectivity problems with various services, including the Central Bank of Russia. 

Roskomnadzor ordered Apple and Google to remove Smart Voting-related materials from their platforms, threatening the companies with fines for election interference. The companies complied with the order, which also included a brief block of Google Docs when Navalny published Smart Voting materials on the platform, and removal of videos containing the material on YouTube. Messaging service Telegram censored a chatbot tied to Smart Voting from its platform, stating that it was required to comply in order to comply with the terms of service of Apple and Google's app stores.

Russian invasion of Ukraine 

Internet censorship in Russia intensified in late-February 2022 amid the country's invasion of Ukraine, due to Roskomnadzor orders and federal laws prohibiting the dissemination of dissent and "knowingly false" information regarding the Russian military—which includes any materials and reporting that does not align with official government information and statements. These orders have applied primarily to foreign (such as BBC News, Deutsche Welle, RFE/RL, Voice of America, and the Ukraine Ministry of Internal Affairs-run Look for Your Own) and independent (such as Current Time TV, Interfax, and Meduza) media outlets. Facebook and Twitter were also ordered blocked in retaliation for their censorship of state-owned media outlets such as RT and Sputnik.

On 11 March 2022, Belarusian political police GUBOPiK arrested and detained Mark Bernstein, a Minsk-based Russian Wikipedia editor who was editing the article about the invasion, accusing him of the "spread of anti-Russian materials" and of violating Russian "fake news" law.

In April–July 2022, the Russian authorities put several Wikipedia articles on their list of forbidden sites, and then ordered search engines to mark Wikipedia as a violator of Russian laws.

Russian authorities have blocked or removed about 138,000 websites since Russia began its invasion of Ukraine in February 2022.

See also 
 Censorship of GitHub in Russia
 Sovereign Internet Law
 Internet in Russia
 Mass surveillance in Russia
 Media freedom in Russia
 Political repression of cyber-dissidents

Notes

References

External links 
 Official website of the Russian Department of Monitoring of Communications, Information technologies, and mass Communications (ROSKOMNADZOR)
 Normative acts. The website of the Russian Department of Monitoring of Communications, Information technologies, and mass Communications (ROSKOMNADZOR) accessed September 30, 2020
 

 
Russia
Russia
Russia
Law of Russia